Shiga 2nd district (Shiga[-ken dai-]ni-ku) is a single-member electoral district for the House of Representatives, the lower house of the National Diet of Japan. It covers Northeastern Shiga, today namely the cities of Hikone, Nagahama, Maibara, the dissolved towns of Aitō and Kotō in present-day Higashiōmi City and the former counties of Echi and Inukami. The district borders were redrawn in the 2002 redistricting and reapportionment, before that it had reached further to the South and covered Yōkaichi and Ōmihachiman cities and all of Echi, Kanzaki and Gamō counties. As of 2012, 264,168 voters resided in the district.

Shiga 2nd district was initially won by Masayoshi Takemura of New Party Harbinger (NPH), the former three-term governor of Shiga who had represented the five-member Shiga At-large district before the electoral reform since 1986 and was Chief Cabinet Secretary in the anti-LDP coalition Hosokawa Cabinet and Minister of Finance in the LDP-JSP-NPH Murayama Cabinet. In the 2000 Representatives election, he ran as an independent with Democratic Party support and lost to Liberal Democrat Akira Konishi. Konishi died in 2001, the resulting by-election was won by his younger brother Osamu. But in the general House of Representatives election of 2003, Democrat Issei Tajima narrowly beat Konishi who won a seat in the proportional vote. In the "postal election" of 2005, Tajima defended the seat as Konishi ran as independent postal privatization rebel and the LDP sent "assassin" candidate Yūji Fujii. Fujii won a proportional seat in 2005, but lost it in 2009 as Tajima won the district race by a large margin; in 2010, Fujii was elected mayor of Nagahama City. In the 2012 House of Representatives election, Ken'ichirō Ueno who had represented the 1st district for the Liberal Democrats between 2005 and 2009 moved to the 2nd district and beat Tajima.

List of representatives

Election results

References 

Shiga Prefecture
Districts of the House of Representatives (Japan)